Vielka Michelle Peralta Luna (born 13 April 1999 in Santo Domingo) is a volleyball player from the Dominican Republic.

She played the 2018 FIVB Volleyball Women's Nations League, and the 2017 FIVB Volleyball Women's U23 World Championship.

Clubs 
  Deportivo Nacional (2018)

References

External links 
 FIVB profile
 FIVB youth profile
 https://volleymob.com/peruvian-club-geminis-de-comas-signs-two-dominican-national-teamers/

1999 births
Living people
Dominican Republic women's volleyball players
Sportspeople from Santo Domingo